is a junction passenger railway station located in Asahi-ku, Yokohama, Kanagawa Prefecture, Japan, operated by the private railway operator Sagami Railway (Sotetsu).

Lines
Futamatagawa Station is served by the Sōtetsu Main Line and Sōtetsu Izumino Line. It lies 10.5 km from the terminus of the Sōtetsu Main Line at Yokohama Station, and is the terminus for the Izumino Line.

Station layout
The station consists of two island platforms serving four tracks.

Platforms

 Platform 3 is used mostly by trains from the Izumino Line, and platform 4 is used mostly by trains from the Main Line.

Adjacent stations

History
Futamatagawa Station opened on May 12, 1926. The Izumino Line opened on April 8, 1976.

Passenger statistics
In fiscal 2019, the station was used by an average of 82,603 passengers daily.

The passenger figures for previous years are as shown below.

Surrounding area
Kanagawa Prefectural Police Driver License Center
Kanagawa Prefectural Archives
Kanagawa Cancer Center
Kanagawa Prefectural Futamata River Nursing and Welfare High School
Kanagawa Prefectural Industrial Technology Junior College
Yokohama Fujimigaoka Gakuen Secondary School

See also
 List of railway stations in Japan

References

External links

  

Railway stations in Kanagawa Prefecture
Railway stations in Yokohama
Stations of Sagami Railway
Railway stations in Japan opened in 1926